Visitors to Dominica normally do not require a visa unless they are nationals of the Dominican Republic or Haiti.

Dominica signed a mutual visa-waiver agreement with the European Union on 28 May 2015 which was ratified on 15 December 2015. This agreement allows all citizens of states that are contracting parties to the Schengen Agreement to stay without a visa for a maximum period of 90 days in any 180-day period.

Nationals of France can enter and visit for up to 14 days using a valid or expired National identity card (CNIS). For holders of expired CNIS, the document must be issued between 2004-2013 and the holder must be 18 or older on the date of issue.

Visa policy map

Visa requirement 

Holders of the following passports do not require a visa for 6 months (unless otherwise noted) to visit Dominica:

Visitor statistics
Most visitors arriving to Dominica were from the following countries of nationality:

See also

 Visa requirements for Dominica citizens

References

Dominica
Foreign relations of Dominica